Mount Kropotkin is a peak on the west side of Jøkulkyrkja Mountain in the Mühlig-Hofmann Mountains of Queen Maud Land, Antarctica. It was mapped by the Norsk Polarinstitutt from surveys and air photos by the Sixth Norwegian Antarctic Expedition, 1956–60. The peak was also mapped by the Soviet Antarctic Expedition in 1961 and named for Russian anarchist Peter Kropotkin.

References

Mountains of Queen Maud Land
Princess Astrid Coast
Peter Kropotkin